Bienemann is a surname. Notable people with the surname include:

 Tom Bienemann (1928–1999), American football player
 Troy Bienemann (born 1983), American football player
  (1540–1591), German male theologian and poet